This is a list of electoral results for the Electoral district of Yalgoo in Western Australian state elections.

Members for Yalgoo

Election results

Elections in the 1890s

References

Western Australian state electoral results by district